The Flying Marine is a 1929 American action film directed by Albert S. Rogell and starring Ben Lyon, Shirley Mason and Jason Robards Sr. The film centers around a tale of brothers romancing the same girl. The Flying Marine was released in both sound and silent versions.

Plot
Mitch Moran (Jason Robards Sr.), a commercial pilot, takes his young brother, Steve (Ben Lyon) under his wing. Steve, a military aviator, has just been discharged from the Marines.

Both brothers fall in love with Sally (Shirley Mason), who is first attracted to the more dashing image of Steve but she soon discovers he is irresponsible and that it is actually Mitch she loves.

About to break her engagement, Sally receives word that Steve has been injured in an accident resulting from stunt work for a film. She and Mitch agree their relationship must be kept secret from Steve. The younger brother who had lost his hearing as a result of the injury, finds out that Mitch and Sally raised the money for an operation he needs.

Steve regains his hearing and goes back to stunt flying but to save his brother from a midair disaster, he sacrifices his own life.

Cast
 Ben Lyon as Steve Moran  
 Shirley Mason as Sally  
 Jason Robards Sr. as Mitch Moran

Production
Aviation film historian Stephen Pendo, in Aviation in the Cinema (1985) characterized The Flying Marine as a typical early "talkie" with a heavy reliance on dialogue, with as much as 70 percent of the film taken up by conversations.

Reception
Aviation film historian James M. Farmer in Celluloid Wings: The Impact of Movies on Aviation (1984), had a similar reaction, saying that The Flying Marine was "... long on talk. Short on air action, save the concluding sequence and earlier air crash."

In a modern review in the TV Guide, The Flying Marine rated only one star out of five. The review stated: "Only the capable performances by the cast and some nifty airplane sequences keep this tepid tale of brothers romancing the same girl from being a total bore. ...Could have been better had more effort been applied to action sequences instead of the dull dramatics."

References

Notes

Citations

Bibliography

 Farmer, James H. Celluloid Wings: The Impact of Movies on Aviation (1st ed.). Blue Ridge Summit, Pennsylvania: TAB Books 1984. .
 Munden, Kenneth White. The American Film Institute Catalog of Motion Pictures Produced in the United States, Part 1. Berkeley, California: University of California Press, 1997. . 
 Paris, Michael. From the Wright Brothers to Top gun: Aviation, Nationalism, and Popular Cinema. Manchester, UK: Manchester University Press, 1995. .
 Pendo, Stephen. Aviation in the Cinema. Lanham, Maryland: Scarecrow Press, 1985. .
 Wynne, H. Hugh. The Motion Picture Stunt Pilots and Hollywood's Classic Aviation Movies. Missoula, Montana: Pictorial Histories Publishing Co., 1987. .

External links
 
 
 

1929 films
1920s action films
1920s English-language films
American aviation films
American action films
Films directed by Albert S. Rogell
Columbia Pictures films
American black-and-white films
1920s American films